Sarcodontia is a genus of toothed fungi in the family Meruliaceae. It was circumscribed by Hungarian–Croatian mycologist Stephan Schulzer von Müggenburg in 1866, with Sarcodontia mali as the type species.

Species
Sarcodontia crocea (Schwein.) Kotl. (1953)
Sarcodontia fragilissima (Berk. & (M.A.Curtis) Nikol. (1961)
Sarcodontia pachyodon (Pers.) Spirin (2001)
Sarcodontia setosa (Pers.) Donk (1952)
Sarcodontia sibirica (Pilát) Nikol. (1961)
Sarcodontia spumea (Sowerby) Spirin (2001)

References

Meruliaceae
Polyporales genera
Taxa described in 1866